St. Clair Smith (July 10, 1889 – May 3, 1988) was a justice of the South Dakota Supreme Court from January 9, 1937 to December 1, 1962.

Born in Brown County, South Dakota, Smith received his law degree from the George Washington University Law School, and practiced in Aberdeen, South Dakota, from 1913 until his appointment to the bench.

Smith was initially appointed to the court, and was reelected in 1940, and every six years thereafter until his retirement.

Smith died at his home in Pierre, South Dakota, at the age of 98.

References

1889 births
1988 deaths
People from Brown County, South Dakota
George Washington University Law School alumni
Justices of the South Dakota Supreme Court